The Woman who Sings is a 1978 Soviet film by Aleksandr Orlov. It is a musical melodrama and fictionalized biography of Alla Pugacheva, where the heroine is represented by Anna Streltsova.

The All-Union premiere of the film took place on March 2, 1979. According to the results of the Soviet film distribution in 1979, the film won first place, having collected 55 million spectators, and the performer of the leading role Alla Pugacheva according to the poll of the magazine Soviet Screen was named "The Best Actress of the Year". At the same time the film itself took only 53 place in the vote for the best film of the year. "The Woman who Sings" occupies the 27th place in attendance in the history of Soviet box-office.

Plot
The film is about pop singer Anna Streltsova, who is deliberating whether or not to give up her stage career, since she still does not have that song which would help her achieve her full potential.

At the same time, the heroine's personal life is developing unsuccessfully. Conflicts with her husband and the eventual divorce unsettle the woman. But even in a stressful condition, she does not want to give up her favorite work, continuing to sing and make her way to fame.

When Anna reads a poem titled "The Woman I Love", she feels that it would make a good song. Later she meets the poem's author, Andrei, who advises her to change the lyrics to "The Woman who Sings". Even before this Anna's career begins establishing and she starts to sing in many performances. Her songs have already been accomplishments, but still nothing like "The Woman who Sings" which she performs at the end of the film. Anna finally achieves incredible popularity and is now the No. 1 star of the Soviet stage. She tours in major cities, performs in large halls and has great success with the audience.

Cast
Alla Pugacheva - Anna Streltsova
Alla Budnitskaya - Masha, Anna's girlfriend
Nikolay Volkov - Andrei, the poet
Alexander Khochinsky - Valentin, Anna's husband
Vadim Aleksandrov - Ivan Stepanovich Klimkin (Stepanych), administrator
Leonid Garin - Leon, head of the ensemble
Vladimir Shubarin - dancer
Yuri Belov - passenger in an airplane
Ilya Rutberg - Mikhail, Head of the Dance and Instrumental Ensemble

Music

Soundtrack
Originally Aleksandr Zatsepin was to score the soundtrack. However, during the filming there was a conflict between Zatsepin and Pugacheva due to the fact that she, without warning him in advance, inserted her songs (under the pseudonym Boris Gorbonos) without his knowledge. Because of this, Zatsepin refused to be the composer, but agreed to leave his songs in the film. As a result, all background music was written by Alla Pugacheva.

Background music in the picture consists of two compositions, which later became songs in Pugacheva's repertoire. The episode with the child, as well as the conversation with Andrei and a rehearsal before the contest, is accompanied by a melody that later became the song "I Will Not Give You to Anyone" (Alla Pugacheva's music, Larisa Kulikova's lyrics, appeared in the repertoire of the singer in 1987). In the scene of the last conversation, Streltsova and her husband behind the scenes sounded vocalizing this melody.

At the last minute of the film the montage of Streltsova walking on the observation deck on the Lenin Hills, along the Victory Park in Tolyatti, a concert at the Volgar Sports Palace in Tolyatti is accompanied by a melody that later became the song "Applying all Force" (Alla Pugacheva's music, the words of Yevgeny Yevtushenko, appeared in the repertoire of the singer in 1978).

Also in the film was to sound the song "In the Grove of the Guelder-rose" to the music of Alla Pugacheva and verses of Yunna Morits, however the poet forbade the song to be used for her poems in the film. Subsequently, Pugacheva put other lyrics — a poem by Oleg Milyavsky, on original music of this song and so in Pugachev's repertoire appeared the song "Dad Bought a Car". Additionally, in the episode of the concert at the Railwaymen's Club, before the song "Come" sounded the first few measures of the song "What was Once", which was recorded by Pugacheva for the movie 31 June but did not make it into the film.

The text of the song "The Woman Who Sings" was originally written by the poet Qaysin Quli in Karachay-Balkar language, translated into Russian by Naum Grebnev and was called "The Woman I Love". Pugacheva removed two verses, changed the viewpoint from the third to the first person and amended the last line in the verses.

The song "If Long Suffering" was recorded for the movie The Cook and the Singer (1978) and sounded there in full. According to the original idea, this song should not have been in the "Woman Who Sings".

Songs

Reception
During the time of its release, the film had a mixed critical reception.

References

External links

Soviet musical drama films
1970s musical drama films
1978 romantic drama films
Soviet romantic drama films
Films directed by Aleksandr Orlov
Films scored by Aleksandr Zatsepin
1978 films